The Bauer 5GBioShield, usually shortened to 5GBioShield, is a fraudulent protective device which the sellers claims to protect against radiation from 5G mobile networks. The device was invented by clinical pharmacist Jacques Bauer and former scientist Ilija Lakicevic and marketed by Sacha Stone. The product, which was sold for approximately £330 through an affiliate marketing scheme, was found to be composed of a normal USB thumb drive and a sticker. As of April 26, 2022, it is now not possible to purchase the USB key from the official website. British Trading Standards determined that the device was a scam.

Description 
The manufacturers claim that: 

The device is a 128 MB USB thumb drive containing marketing documents and usage instructions. The device is housed in a clear perspex block depicting a stylised depiction of St George slaying a dragon, based on the reverse of a personal medal originally made by William Wyon for Albert, Prince Consort.

Lakicevic, the co-inventor of the product, describes the device as containing a "new energy" embedded in a sticker, and that the USB stick is merely a carrier and need not be powered on to work. Lakicevic's claims regarding this product were published in a series of self-published articles in International Journal of Science and Research (ITNJ), a pay-to-publish science journal.

Reception 
The device was recommended in a report published by Glastonbury Town Council. Town councillor Toby R. Hall recommended that the device could be "helpful" and "provide protection"  due to its "wearable holographic nano-layer catalyser".

An analysis by Pen Test Partners, however, concluded that this device was nothing more than a cheap unbranded USB thumb drive. The security firm concluded that the device "should [not] be promoted by publicly-funded bodies".

Following this report, the device was investigated by Trading Standards and found to be a scam and the matter had been referred to City of London Police Fraud Squad.

References 

5G conspiracy theorists
Fraudulent detection devices
Medical controversies
Quantum mysticism
Confidence tricks